Six ships of the Royal Navy have borne the name HMS Astraea, HMS Astree or HMS Astrea, after the figure of Astraea in Greek mythology:

 was a storeship, formerly a Spanish ship captured in 1739.  She was burnt by accident in 1743.
 was a 32-gun fifth rate launched in 1781 and wrecked on the Anegada Reefs in the Virgin Islands in 1808.
 was a 36-gun fifth rate launched in 1810, on harbour service from 1823 and broken up in 1851.
 was a 38-gun fifth rate, formerly a French ship captured in 1810.  She was renamed HMS Pomone in 1811 and was broken up in 1816.
HMS Astrea was a wooden screw frigate ordered in 1861, but canceled in 1863.
 was an  launched in 1893 and sold in 1920.  She was then resold and finally broken up in Germany.

Battle honours
Ships named Astraea have earned the following battle honours:
Groix Island, 1795
Gloire, 1795
St Lucia, 1796
Egypt, 1801
Tamatave, 1811
Cameroons, 1914

See also 
 

Royal Navy ship names